Abbasi (also Romanized as ‘Abbāsī; also known as Alān ‘Abbāsī) is a village in Zalaqi-ye Gharbi Rural District, Besharat District, Aligudarz County, Lorestan Province, Iran. At the 2006 census, its population was 90, in 14 families.

References 

Towns and villages in Aligudarz County